Matthew "Matt" Peck (born July 16, 1980 in London, Ontario) is a field hockey player, who played for the Canada national field hockey team as a goalkeeper. He was a member of the VRC Jokers, and played his first international senior tournament in 2005.

International senior competitions
 2006 – World Cup Qualifier, Changzou City (10th)
 2006 — Commonwealth Games, Melbourne (9th)
 2007 — Pan American Games, Rio de Janeiro (1st)
 2010 — Hockey World Cup, Delhi (11th)

References
Canadian Olympic Committee

1980 births
Canadian male field hockey players
Field hockey players at the 2006 Commonwealth Games
Living people
Sportspeople from London, Ontario
Pan American Games gold medalists for Canada
Pan American Games medalists in field hockey
Field hockey players at the 2007 Pan American Games
Medalists at the 2007 Pan American Games
Commonwealth Games competitors for Canada
2010 Men's Hockey World Cup players